Iclea is a large main belt asteroid with the minor planet designation, 286 Iclea. It was discovered by Austrian astronomer Johann Palisa on 3 August 1889 in Vienna, and named for the heroine of Camille Flammarion's astronomical romance Uranie. The orbital plane is tilted at an angle of 17.9° to the plane of the ecliptic.

This asteroid has a classification of CX in the Tholen taxonomy, indicating a generally carbonaceous composition. Infrared measurements indicate a cross-sectional diameter of approximately 94.3 km. Photometric observations of this asteroid in 2001 provided a light curve that was used to derive a synodic rotation period of 15.365 hours with an amplitude of 0.15 magnitude.

References

External links
 
 

Background asteroids
Iclea
Iclea
CX-type asteroids (Tholen)
Ch-type asteroids (SMASS)
18890803